Akot railway station is a small railway station in Akola district, Maharashtra. Its code is AKOT. It serves Akot city. The station consists of two platforms. The platforms are not well sheltered. It lacks many facilities including water and sanitation. The station was opened in 1961 lies on Akola–Khandwa metre-gauge section of Hyderabad railway division of South Central Railway and now to Nanded railway division.

See also
 Akola–Ratlam line

References

Railway stations in Akola district
Nanded railway division